The 1985 Grambling State Tigers football team represented Grambling State University as a member of the Southwestern Athletic Conference (SWAC) during the 1985 NCAA Division I-AA football season. Led by 43rd-year head coach Eddie Robinson, the Tigers compiled an overall record of 9–3 and a mark of 6–1 in conference play, and finished as SWAC co-champion. Grambling State advanced to the NCAA Division I-AA Football Championship playoffs, where they were defeated by Arkansas State in the first round.

Schedule

References

Grambling State
Grambling State Tigers football seasons
Southwestern Athletic Conference football champion seasons
Grambling State Tigers football